Choi Byung Hoon  (최병훈) (born 1952 in Kangwondo, South Korea) is a South Korean artist. He is considered by many to be the father of Contemporary Korean Design. Choi graduated from the Hong-ik University with a degree in applied fine arts in 1974, a few years later he completed his masters of fine arts from Hong-ik. Since his graduation, Choi has become well known for his work in modernizing the traditions of Korean design. Choi gathers inspiration from Mayan, Incan, African and Indian cultures.

 He had been a professor of College of Fine Arts at Hongik University (Seoul, Korea) from 1990 to 2017 and is currently Honorary Professor at Hongik University.

Work
SOLO EXHIBITION

 2014 Friedman Benda, New York, NY
 2012 Yidogallery, Seoul, Korea
 2011 Johyun Gallery, Busan, Korea
 2010 Galerie DOWNTOWN, Paris, France
 2008 Gallery HANGIL, Paju, Korea
 2008 Galerie DOWNTOWN, Paris, France
 2007 Seoul Living Design Fair 2007 Coex, Seoul, Korea
 2006 Galerie DOWNTOWN, Paris, France
 2002 Johyun Gallery, Busan, Korea
 2001 Galerie DOWNTOWN, Paris, France
 2000 Johyun Gallery, Busan, Korea
 1999 Ellen Kim Murphy Gallery, Seoul, Korea
 1997 Galerie DOWNTOWN, Paris, France
 1996 Galerie DOWNTOWN, Paris, France
 1996 Gallery 釜山, Busan, Korea
 1994 SunGallery, Seoul Art Fair, Seoul, Korea
 1993 SunGallery, Seoul, Korea

SELECTED GROUP EXHIBITION

 2015 Korea now! Design, Craft, Fashion and Graphic Design in Korea exhibition, Musée des Arts décoratifs, Paris, France
 2015 Living In Art II, Connect, Seomi International, Los Angeles, CA, USA
 2015 Living In Art I, Let's Art, Seomi International, Los Angeles, CA, USA
 2014 National Museum of Modern and Contemporary Art, Seoul, South Korea
 2014 Vanities: Art of the Dressing Table, The Metropolitan Museum of Art, New York, NY
 2013 The Page Gallery, Seoul, South Korea
 2013 Gwangju Design Biennale, Gwangju, South Korea
 2012 Design Miami Basel, Basel, Switzerland
 2012 Hand of Dreaming, Gallery Wooduk, Seoul, South Korea
 2012 Design Days Dubai, Dubai, United Arab Emirates
 2012 Flow, Hongik Museum of Art, Seoul, South Korea
 2011 Curator Project, Hongik Museum of Art, South Korea
 2011 TABLE+booktopia, Heyri, South Korea
 2011 KIAF, Seoul, South Korea
 2011 Design Miami Basel, Basel, Switzerland
 2011 Chung-A Art Center Grand Opening, Chung-A Art Center, Seoul, South Korea
 2011 Pavillon des Arts et du Design, Grand Palais, Paris, France
 2010 Design Miami, Miami, Florida
 2010 Seoul Design Fair, Seoul, South Korea
 2010 ART GWANGJU, Gwangju, South Korea
 2010 Design Miami Basel, Basel, Switzerland
 2010 Contemporary Korean Design, R20th Century Gallery, New York, NY
 2010 Moments in Between, Museum of Vancouver, Canada
 2009 Design Miami, Florida
 2009 FIAC, Paris, France
 2009 Design Art London, London, UK
 2009 The Seoul Art Exhibition, Seoul Museum of Art, Seoul, South Korea
 2009 OUTDOOR FURNITURE, Lio Gallery, Heyri Art Valley, South Korea
 2009 GaNa Art Center, Seoul, South Korea
 2009 Le Salon du Collectionneur, Grand Palais, Paris, France
 2009 DESIGN High, Gallery Seomi, Seoul, South Korea
 2009 Design Miami, Basel, Switzerland
 2009 Pavillon des Arts et du Design, Grand Palais, Paris, France
 2009 TEFAF Maastricht, The Netherlands
'"FAIRS'"

FAIRS

 2015 Design Miami/ Basel Switzerland
 2014 FOG, San Francisco, CA, USA
 2014 Collective, New York City, NY, USA
 2014 The Salon, New York City, NY, USA
 2012 Design Miami Miami, FL
 2012 PAD, Pavilion of Art & Design, London
 2012 Design Miami/ Basel, Basel, Switzerland
 2012 Design Days Dubai, Dubai
 2011 Design Miam, Miami, FL
 2011 Design Miami/ Basel, Basel, Switzerland
 2010 Design Miami, Miami, FL
 2010 Design Miami/ Basel, Switzerland
 2009 Design Miami/ Basel Switzerland
 2009 Design Miami, Miami, FL

SELECTED PUBLIC COLLECTIONS

Busan Museum of Art, Busan, South Korea
Chung Wa Dae, Office of the President, Republic of Korea
Daegu University Museum, Daegu, South Korea
Hongik University Museum, Seoul, South Korea
Korean Crafts Council, Seoul, South Korea
Korean Culture and Art Foundation, Seoul, South Korea
Leeum, Samsung Museum of Art, Seoul, South Korea
The Metropolitan Museum of Art, New York, NY
Musee des Arts Decoratifs, Paris, France
National Museum of Modern and Contemporary Art, Seoul, South Korea
Seoul art Center-Design Museum, Seoul, South Korea
Seoul Metropolitan Museum of Art, Seoul, South Korea
Sun Jae Museum, Kyungju, Korea
Total Museum, Seoul, South Korea
UN Secretariat International Organization, Geneva, Switzerland
Vitra Design Museum, Weil am Rhein, Germany

References

External links
 Official Website

South Korean artists